Acthorpe is a hamlet in the East Lindsey district of Lincolnshire, England. Acthorpe is part of the civil parish of Elkington.

Acthorpe does not appear in the Domesday Book and is considered a deserted medieval village.

Acthorpe Farm House is a Grade II listed building of red brick, dating from 1740, with 19th- and 20th-century alterations.

Acthorpe Wood is an area of semi-natural ancient woodland.

References

External links

Hamlets in Lincolnshire
East Lindsey District